The Voodoo World Tour is a tour by American R&B/neo soul singer D'Angelo in support of his Platinum selling album, Voodoo. The tour started March 1, with the first of five nights in Los Angeles, CA at the House of Blues. The singer's itinerary included two North American Legs,<ref>d'angelo eyes q-tip, mosdef and common for u.s. tour.www.mtv.com/news.Feb.9,2000</ref> as well as dates throughout Europe and South America.

Background
Following Voodoos release, D'Angelo embarked on his second international tour in support of the album. The tour was sponsored by the clothing company Levi Strauss & Co., and it featured D'Angelo promoting an end to gun violence. After signing an initiative on June 7, 2000, at Hamilton High School in West Los Angeles to collect a million signatures by November 7 in support of "common-sense solutions" to end gun violence, the anti-gun violence organization PAX agreed to sponsor the tour. The tour was also set to feature a wall composed of denim by Levi's, made available for fans to sign in support of anti-gun violence. Consisting of a group assembled and directed by Questlove, the Soultronics, composed mostly of session personnel, the tour became one of the most attended shows of the year. According to a July 2000 issue of Jet magazine, the tour's first half "sold out in every city." It began on March 1, 2000, at the House of Blues in Los Angeles, The tour lasted nearly eight months, while performances went for up to three hours a night.Rosen, Craig. D'Angelo Recalls The Artist's Influence on Him. Yahoo! Music. Retrieved on 2008-11-01. "The Voodoo Tour" was taken internationally to venues including Paris Olympia, Trump Taj Mahal, Brixton Academy, the Montreux Jazz Festival, the North Sea Jazz Festival and the Free Jazz Festival in Brazil. Tour manager Alan Leeds, who previously headed James Brown's late 1960s and early 1970s outings, as well as Prince's Purple Rain tour in the mid-1980s, cited "The Voodoo Tour" as his most memorable gig. J Dilla's group Slum Village opened on several dates, while R&B singer Anthony Hamilton sang backup within the Soultronics on occasion.Collar, Matt. Biography: Anthony Hamilton. Allmusic. Retrieved on 2008-11-30.

The show
In contrast to D'Angelo's supporting tour for Brown Sugar, which presented him performing behind his keyboard on stage, he exhibited a different style of showmanship and energy. Rolling Stone magazine called him "confident and worldly" in his performance, while also stating "No wonder he's alive onstage now, dancing, touching the audience, slamming his microphone down, lying on the ground at the lip of the stage to sing 'One Mo' Gin' while girls grab his legs, his stomach, his crotch." D'Angelo's wardrobe during the tour included tank tops, black leather pants, and boots. On one of the live outings, Rolling Stone described the appearance of the performers, stating "The Soultronics begin each show in all black, but beyond that one requirement, each looks completely distinct. One man is in a deacon's robe, another in a long cape with a knit ski cap that says FBI. There’s a feather boa, a few badass leather coats, and Questlove's mighty Afro. There's a P-Funkish freaky flair to the Soultronics' look."

In a review of D'Angelo's tour-opening performance at the House of Blues, The Hollywood Reporters David Wollock described it as a "three-hour old-school soul marathon that was part 'Get Up (I Feel Like Being a) Sex Machine', part 'Let's Get It On', part 'Move on Up' gospel exuberance ... with call-and-response and other crowd-rousing church conventions". Wollock praised D'Angelo for his energy and display of showmanship, and wrote that "like the best hip-hop emcees who can rock a crowd with two turntables and a microphone, D moved the crowd with pure voice and charisma." A staff writer for the Chicago Defender lauded his performance at the Chicago Theatre, calling it "an explosive mixture of R&B, soul and funk."

With ticket prices ranging from $49 to $79, the tour became one of the most attended shows of 2000. The tour began on March 1, 2000, at the House of Blues in Los Angeles, while other venues included Paris Olympia, Trump Taj Mahal, Brixton Academy, the Montreux Jazz Festival, and the Essence Jazz Festival in New Orleans. By July, the tour's first half had sold out in each city. The tour lasted nearly eight months, while performances went for up to three hours a night. The Voodoo Tour was taken internationally, with one of the most notable performances being the Free Jazz Festival in Brazil.

Critical reception
Performances earned rave reviews from critics and publications, who praised D'Angelo's energy and "charisma as a live performer", as well as the Soultronics group,Hilburn, Robert. At Midyear, Shining Gems in a Dull Season. Los Angeles Times. Retrieved on 2008-12-20. and received comparisons to outings by the legendary funk bands Parliament and Sly & the Family Stone. Tanya Bell of The Gazette wrote that the group "displayed enormous talent as it took them two hours to play 11 songs." A staff writer for the Chicago Defender lauded his performance at the Chicago Theatre, calling it "an explosive mixture of R&B, soul and funk." Rolling Stone called him "abundantly gifted, eye-poppingly spectacular", "confident and worldly" in his performance at the House of Blues in Los Angeles. It compared the performance to his past concerts, stating "he's alive onstage now, dancing, touching the audience, slamming his microphone down, lying on the ground at the lip of the stage to sing 'One Mo' Gin' while girls grab his legs, his stomach, his crotch."

In a review of D'Angelo's tour-opening performance at the House of Blues, David Wollock of The Hollywood Reporter called it a "three-hour old-school soul marathon that was part 'Get Up (I Feel Like Being a) Sex Machine', part 'Let's Get It On', part 'Move on Up' gospel exuberance [...] with call-and-response and other crowd-rousing church conventions". He added that, "like the best hip-hop emcees who can rock a crowd with two turntables and a microphone, D moved the crowd with pure voice and charisma." Kaia Shivers of the Los Angeles Sentinel'' commented that his Los Angeles tour stop placed the city "under a spell that it seems hard pressed to shake."

Reviewing his March performance at New York City's Radio City Music Hall, rock critic Robert Christgau dubbed D'Angelo "R&B Jesus" and proclaimed himself a "believer". Christgau praised D'Angelo's delivery and compared the concert to a 1981 P-Funk outing at the Apollo Theater, stating "D'Angelo sang and danced and preached and flexed and crooned and humped the floor and covered Roberta Flack and snapped a mike stand in two and danced and sang and sang some more. Everything meshed; all stops were pulled out. It was already the greatest concert I'd seen in years when Redman and Method Man propelled the climactic 'Left and Right' through the vaulted ceiling. I flashed on P-Funk's 'Sadie', Apollo 1981. What a privilege to experience such a thing again." He also compared it to Marvin Gaye in concert, writing that "I saw Marvin Gaye at this venue shortly before he was murdered, and it was no contest. Gaye was fine, but self-indulgent and riddled with blank spots."

Opening acts
 Slum Village (USA—Leg 1 & 2)
 Mos Def  (USA—Leg 1)
 Lucy Pearl  (USA—Leg 2 - select dates)
 Amel Larrieux (USA—Leg 2 - at least Indianapolis)

Set list
 "Voodoo" (Intro)
 "Devil's Pie"
 "Send It On"
 "Smooth"
 "Chicken Grease"
 "How Does it Feel?" (teaser)
 "Get Up (I Feel Like Being a) Sex Machine"
 "Me and Those Dreamin' Eyes Of Mine"
 "Sh*t, Damn, Motherf*cker"
 "One Mo' Gin"
 "The Root" (teaser)
 "Feel Like Makin' Love"
 "Left and Right"
 "Left & Right (pt. 2)"
 Interlude
 "Brown Sugar"
 "Jonz in my Bonz"
 "Lady"
 "Fall In Love"
 "Untitled (How Does It Feel)"
 "Funk Jam"

Band
 The Soultronics

Tour dates

References

D'Angelo concert tours
2000 concert tours